Gérard Spinelli is the Mayor of the French town of Beausoleil, in the Alpes-Maritimes département, adjoining part of the Principality of Monaco.

He was first elected in 1995 and served until 2001, and then returned to office in 2008.

References

Mayors of places in Provence-Alpes-Côte d'Azur
Living people
Year of birth missing (living people)